The Labor Union of National Taiwan University (LUNTU), proposed by full-time research assistants, contract staffs, and school-time workers, was a labor union that organized the workers at the National Taiwan University. And on 9 December 2012, it convened the inaugural meeting at Taipei Taiwan. Then, according to the "Trade Union Law" of Taiwan, on 1 April 2013, the Taipei City Government approved the establishment of the LUNTU, as an enterprise union to tertiary institutions.

References

2012 establishments in Taiwan
National Taiwan University organizations
Trade unions in Taiwan
Trade unions established in 2012